Neklinovsky District is an administrative and municipal district (raion), one of the forty-three in Rostov Oblast, Russia. It is located in the west of the oblast, immediately adjacent to the border with Ukraine's Donetsk Oblast. It surrounds the city of Taganrog on that city's landward side. Its administrative center is the rural locality (a selo) of Pokrovskoye. Population: 84,915 (2010 Census);  The population of Pokrovskoye accounts for 14.6% of the district's total population.

Notable residents 

Vladimir Petlyakov (1891–1942), Soviet aeronautical engineer and aircraft designer, born in Sambek
Andrei Uvarov (born 1971), football player

References

Notes

Sources

Districts of Rostov Oblast